

Surname 

Ducasse may refer to:
 Andrés Ducasse (born 1992)
 Alain Ducasse (born 1956), French chef
 Alice Ducasse (1841–1923), 19th century opera singer and teacher
 César Ducasse (born 1979)
 Charles Ducasse (1932–1983)
 Château Larcis Ducasse
 Curt John Ducasse (1881–1969), French philosopher concerned with aesthetics and philosophy of mind
 Francisco Ducasse (born 1996)
 Gervais Emmanuel Ducasse (1903–1988)
 Isidore Lucien Ducasse, who published books under the name Comte de Lautréamont
 Jean-Baptiste du Casse (1646–1715), French colonial governor of Saint-Domingue, slave trader, and admiral under Louis XIV
 Jean-Pierre Ducasse (1944–1969)
Micaela Martinez DuCasse (1913–1989) American artist, author, and educator, known for her murals and sculptures.
 Pierre Ducasse (politician) (born 1972), Canadian politician and New Democratic Party (NDP) activist
 Vladimir Ducasse (born 1987), Haitian-born American football player

Other uses 

 Ducasse d'Ath
 Ducasse de Mons
 Ducasse Wine Merchants